Pentti Lassi Pellervo Pakarinen (29 August 1924 – 27 December 2007) was a Finnish ophthalmologist and politician, born in Oulu. He was a Member of the Parliament of Finland, representing the People's Party of Finland from 1962 to 1965 and the Liberal People's Party from 1965 to 1966.

References

1924 births
2007 deaths
People from Oulu
People's Party of Finland (1951) politicians
Liberals (Finland) politicians
Members of the Parliament of Finland (1962–66)
Finnish ophthalmologists
Finnish military personnel of World War II